Bohl is a surname. Notable people with the surname include:

 Craig Bohl (born 1958), American football coach
 Georgia Bohl (born 1997), Australian swimmer
 Jochen Bohl (born 1950), German Lutheran bishop
 Otto Bohl (1885–1969), German politician
 Piers Bohl (1865–1921), Latvian mathematician
 Steffen Bohl (born 1983), German football player